Andrew Browne may refer to:
Andrew Browne (footballer, born 1984), Australian rules footballer for Fremantle and Claremont
Andrew Browne (footballer, born 1990), Australian rules footballer for Richmond
Andrew Browne (artist) (born 1960), Australian artist
Andrew Browne (mayor), in 1574 Mayor of Galway
Andrew Browne (rugby union) (born 1987), Irish rugby union player

See also
Andrew Brown (disambiguation)